Patricia Wheel (December 9, 1925 – June 3, 1986) was an American actress who appeared in films and TV series from the 1940s to the 1970s.

Early years
Wheel was the daughter of Lester H. Wheel and his wife, Helene, and she had a sister, Lesley. She was born in New York City in 1925.

Career 
During World War II, Wheel participated in a six-month USO tour through the South Pacific. Her activities with the troupe included tap dancing and acting in a production of Doughgirls. She also presented plays using people selected from the military personnel at Army camps.

Wheel began her acting career in 1949, appearing in TV series like A Woman to Remember, Ford Theatre, Cameo Theatre, Somerset Maugham TV Theatre, The Billy Rose Show, and Lux Video Theatre among others.

She also appeared in the films Cry Uncle! and Jeremy.

Wheel appeared in several Broadway Productions during the 1950s and 1960s like Cyrano de Bergerac, Charley's Aunt and Butterflies Are Free.

Personal life and death
On September 27, 1954, Wheel married industrial designer Eric Henry Alba Teran. They had two sons, Andrew and Timothy Teran. She died on June 3, 1986, aged 61, in New York City after a long illness.

Selected filmography

Film
 Cry Uncle! (1971)
 Jeremy (1973)

Television
 A Woman to Remember (1949)
 Ford Theatre (1950)
 Cameo Theatre (1950)
 Somerset Maugham TV Theatre (1950)
 The Billy Rose Show (1951)
 Lux Video Theatre (1951)
 The Web (1951)
 The Guiding Light (1952)
 Kraft Television Theatre (1950-1954)
 Westinghouse Studio One (1952-1954)
 Producers' Showcase (1955)
 Armstrong Circle Theatre (1950-1959)
 The United States Steel Hour (1954-1961)
 Naked City (1961-1962)
 The Defenders (1964)
 For the People (1965)
 Coronet Blue (1967)
 The Doctors (1973)
 The Adams Chronicles (1976)

References

External links

 
 

1925 births
1986 deaths
American film actresses
American television actresses
Actresses from New York City
20th-century American actresses